Billings is a town in northwest Noble County, Oklahoma, United States. The population was 509 at the 2010 census, an increase from the figure of 436 in 2000. It was the childhood home of Oklahoma governor Henry Bellmon.

History
Billings was called "White Rock", when it was founded in 1893, at the time of the Cherokee Strip Land Run. Billings' economy was based on agriculture in the surrounding area. The Enid and Tonkawa Railway (acquired by the Chicago, Rock Island and Pacific Railway in 1900) built a spur line out from North Enid in 1899. The railroad, however, did not go through White Rock, so the residents soon moved to the present location. The new town opened October 23, 1899 and was renamed for M. O. Billings, a director of the Billings Town Company.

Geography

Climate

Demographics

As of the census of 2010, there were 509 people, 171 households, and 95 families residing in the town. The racial makeup of the town was 93.7% White, 2.9% Native American, and 2.0% from two or more races. Hispanic or Latino of any race were 2.29% of the population.

There were 171 households, out of which 12.3% had children under the age of 18 living with them, 55.6% were married couples living together, 10.5% had a female householder with no husband present, and 44.4% were non-families. 29.2% of all households were made up of individuals, and 28.7% had someone living alone who was 65 years of age or older. The average household size was 2.19 and the average family size was 2.92.

In the town, the population was spread out, with 16.1% under the age of 18, 12.6% from 18 to 24, 21.0% from 25 to 44, 32.5% from 45 to 64, and 20.2% who were 65 years of age or older. The median age was 46.9 years. For every 100 females, there were 87.1 males. For every 100 females age 18 and over, there were 87.9 males.

The median income for a household in the town was $35,481, and the median income for a family was $40,375. Males had a median income of $26,250 versus $17,750 for females. The per capita income for the town was $12,671. About 9.6% of families and 10.6% of the population were below the poverty line, including 16.7% of those under age 18 and 10.9% of those age 65 or over.

Notable person
 Henry Bellmon, former Oklahoma governor; was born in Tonkawa, but raised in Billings.

References

External links
 Encyclopedia of Oklahoma History and Culture - Billings
Voices of Oklahoma interview with Henry Bellmon. First person interview conducted on April 14, 2009 with Henry Bellmon. Original audio and transcript archived with Voices of Oklahoma oral history project.

Towns in Noble County, Oklahoma
Towns in Oklahoma